Rear-Admiral Alexander Robert Hammick (16 February 1887 – 1969) was a Royal Navy officer who served during the First and Second World Wars.

Hammock joined the Royal Navy and was January 1903 posted as naval cadet to the armoured cruiser HMS Hogue, serving in the Channel Squadron. He was promoted to the rank of lieutenant on 31 December 1908, and to commander on 30 June 1922.

He commanded the heavy cruiser  in 1938–1940 and then served as chief of staff to the Flag Officer-in-charge, Greenock in 1940–1942.

Citations

Bibliography
 

1887 births
1969 deaths
Royal Navy admirals of World War II
Royal Navy officers of World War I
Royal Navy officers of World War II